Pidhorodne is a town in Dnipro Raion of Dnipropetrovsk Oblast (province) of Ukraine. It hosts the administration of Pidhorodne urban hromada, one of the hromadas of Ukraine. Population:  In 2001, the population was 17,763.

The populated place is known since 1600 as a "wintering place" (zymivnyk) of Cossacks from Samar and carried a name Bohorodytski Khutory (hamlets of Theotokos).

Soon after the liquidation of the Zaporozhian Sich, in 1778 those hamlets were united into a "state military sloboda" of Pidhorodne being located near the newly established Yekaterinoslav (before being moved to the right bank of Dnieper).

References

Cities in Dnipropetrovsk Oblast
Yekaterinoslav Governorate
Cities of district significance in Ukraine